Nauchalee Rajapakse is a Sri Lankan netball player who represents Sri Lankan netball team in international netball tournaments. She represents Army SC in local netball competitions. 

She was a member of the Sri Lankan contingent which emerged as champions at the 2018 Asian Netball Championships for the record fifth time. She also represented Sri Lanka at the 2019 Netball World Cup where the team finished at 19th position.

References 

1989 births
Living people
People from Galle District
Sri Lankan netball players
2019 Netball World Cup players